The Eastern Hotel is a historic building in Seattle's Chinatown–International District, in the U.S. state of Washington. Located at 506 Maynard Avenue S, the structure was commissioned by Chun Ching Hock for the Wa Chong Company and built by contractor David Dow in 1911. The building has been designated a historical landmark and "won a distinguished award for affordable housing" from the Seattle chapter of the American Institute of Architects.

The building houses Eastern Cafe.

See also 
 List of Seattle landmarks

References

External links

 

1911 establishments in Washington (state)
Buildings and structures in Seattle
Chinatown–International District, Seattle
Defunct hotels in Washington (state)
Hotel buildings completed in 1911